Slekishino is a rural locality (a village) in Gorodishchenskoye Rural Settlement, Nyuksensky District, Vologda Oblast, Russia. The population was 20 as of 2002.

Geography 
Slekishino is located 57 km southwest of Nyuksenitsa (the district's administrative centre) by road. Surovtsevo is the nearest rural locality.

References 

Rural localities in Nyuksensky District